Salakətin (Salaketin) is a village in the Khojavend District of Azerbaijan. The village had an Azerbaijani-majority prior to the expulsion by Armenian forces during the First Nagorno-Karabakh war.

References

External links 

Populated places in Khojavend District